Gregorio Bundio Nuñez (14 May 1928 − 7 March 2015) was a football player and manager.

Nicknamed Goyo, Bundio coached El Salvador from 1968 to 1970 and qualified them for their first ever FIFA World Cup Finals in 1970.

Alianza
Gregorio Bundio was the first coach appointed by the newly formed club Alianza F.C. between 1959 and 1960. 

In January 2011 he was given a pension for life by the National Assembly for his contribution to Salvadoran football.

Personal
Gregorio Bundio son, Roberto Bundio, also was a footballer who played for Fuerte Aguilares and Águila in the Primera División, and Deportivo Armenio in Argentina.

Death
On 7 March 2015, Bundio died at the age of 86 Hospital of San Rafael in Santa Tecla.

References

External links
"Goyo", con estadio en Santa Ana - El Diario de Hoy 
¿QuÉ PASÓ con... "Goyo" Bundio ?Su perfil y triunfos (Profile) - El Diario de Hoy 
 
 - EDH Deportes 
  - El Grafico 

1928 births
2015 deaths
Sportspeople from Avellaneda
Argentine footballers
C.D. Atlético Marte footballers
Salvadoran football managers
Argentine football managers
Expatriate footballers in El Salvador
Expatriate football managers in El Salvador
El Salvador national football team managers
C.D. Águila managers
C.D. FAS managers
Association footballers not categorized by position